Persons in Hiding is a 1939 American crime film directed by Louis King and written by William R. Lipman and Horace McCoy. The film stars Lynne Overman, Patricia Morison, J. Carrol Naish, William "Bill" Henry, Helen Twelvetrees and William Frawley. The film was released on February 10, 1939, by Paramount Pictures.

Plot
Beautiful Dorothy Bronson has a big thirst for luxury, perfume and furs, due to this, she turns thief Freddie Martin into a serial killer for her needs and eventually gets him sent to Alcatraz.

Cast 
Lynne Overman as Agent Pete Griswold
Patricia Morison as Dorothy Bronson
J. Carrol Naish as Freddie 'Gunner' Martin
William "Bill" Henry as Agent Dan Waldron
Helen Twelvetrees as Helen Griswold
William Frawley as Alec Inglis
Judith Barrett as Blase Blonde
William Collier, Sr. as Burt Nast
May Boley as Mme. Thompson
Dennis Morgan as Mike Flagler
Virginia Vale as Flo 
John Hartley as Joe, Dot's Boyfriend
Janet Waldo as Ruth Waldron
Richard Denning as Powder
Leona Roberts as Ma Bronson
Phil Warren as Curly
John Eldredge as Chief Agent Gordon Kingsley
Richard Carle as Zeke Bronson
Roy Gordon as John Nast
John Hart as Male Stenographer
Lillian Yarbo as Beauty Parlor Maid

References

External links 
 

1939 films
Paramount Pictures films
American crime films
1939 crime films
Films directed by Louis King
American black-and-white films
1930s English-language films
1930s American films